Pine Tree Academy (also known as Pine Tree or PTA) is a Seventh-day Adventist, co-educational University preparatory school for boarding and day students in grades K–12.  
It is a part of the Seventh-day Adventist education system, the world's second largest Christian school system. The school is located in Freeport, Maine, north of Portland.

Pine Tree Academy was founded in 1921 on a farm near Auburn, Maine.  The school closed in 1933 because of The Depression.  In 1961, the academy reopened as Pine Tree Memorial School in Freeport.  In 1973, the school began offering all four years of the high school grades.  Today, the academy is the oldest academy in the Northern New England Conference of Seventh-day Adventists.  The academy is accredited by the Middle States Association of Colleges and Schools and by the Adventist Accrediting Association.

The academy has two sports programs—basketball and soccer.  The basketball teams are members of the Maine Principals' Association.  The soccer teams are members of the Maine Christian School Sports League.

In 2018, Derek Michael Boyce, a high school math and science teacher at the school, was arrested for having an inappropriate relationship with one of his students, a fifteen-year-old girl.

See also

 List of Seventh-day Adventist secondary schools
 Seventh-day Adventist education

References

External links
 

Adventist secondary schools in the United States
Private elementary schools in Maine
Private middle schools in Maine
Private high schools in Maine
Schools in Cumberland County, Maine
1921 establishments in Maine
Educational institutions established in 1921